Sartor is a genus of headstander endemic to Brazil. The genus is found in the eastern Amazon Basin, specifically in the Xingu, Tocantins, Mapuera and Trombetas basins.

Species
There are currently three recognized species in this genus:
 Sartor elongatus dos Santos & Jégu, 1987
 Sartor respectus G. S. Myers & A. L. de Carvalho, 1959
 Sartor tucuruiense dos Santos & Jégu, 1987

References

Anostomidae
Fish of South America
Fish of Brazil
Endemic fauna of Brazil
Taxa named by George S. Myers
Taxa named by Antenor Leitão de Carvalho